Xia Xuanze (born 5 January 1979) is a former badminton player from China who played singles at the world level from the late 1990s through the first few years of the 21st century. Now he is a singles coach for the national team of China.

Career 
At one time or another he experienced victory in most of badminton's biggest events. The exception came in his sole appearance at the Olympics when he was beaten in the semifinals of the 2000 Games in Sydney by Indonesia's Hendrawan. Xia settled for a bronze medal there after defeating Denmark's Peter Gade in the playoff for third place. Earlier in that season, Xia had won the prestigious All-England Championships over eighteen-year-old Taufik Hidayat. He captured men's singles at the IBF World Championships in 2003 by defeating Malaysia's Wong Choong Hann. Finally, in international team play, he was a member of the Chinese squad that ended a long drought by capturing the highly coveted Thomas Cup (men's world team competition and trophy) in 2004.

In 2010 Thomas Cup, Xia coached Chen Jin, witnessing his country win 3–0 over Indonesia for their fourth consecutive Thomas Cup.

In 2017, Xia Xuanze together with Zhang Jun replaced Li Yongbo as head coach of the Chinese badminton team.

Player attributes 
Xia's game was marked by impressive speed and agility, aggressive and accurate net play, and adequate, if not overwhelming, overhead power. The power he used in his legs allowed him to "play the shot" very early. This attribute, combined with very sophisticated and consistent deceptive shots, gave some of his opponents the opportunity to win very few points at all.

Achievements

Olympic Games 
Men's singles

World Championships 
Men's singles

Asian Championships 
Men's singles

IBF World Grand Prix 
The World Badminton Grand Prix sanctioned by International Badminton Federation (IBF) from 1983 to 2006.

Men's singles

References 

1979 births
Living people
Sportspeople from Wenzhou
Badminton players from Zhejiang
Chinese male badminton players
Badminton players at the 2000 Summer Olympics
Olympic badminton players of China
Olympic bronze medalists for China
Olympic medalists in badminton
Medalists at the 2000 Summer Olympics
Badminton players at the 2002 Asian Games
Asian Games bronze medalists for China
Asian Games medalists in badminton
Medalists at the 2002 Asian Games
World No. 1 badminton players
Chinese badminton coaches